Dolichestola is a genus of longhorn beetles of the subfamily Lamiinae, containing the following species:

 Dolichestola annulicornis Breuning, 1942
Dolichestola birai Galileo & Santos-Silva, 2016
 Dolichestola densepunctata Breuning, 1942
Dolichestola egeri Martins, Santos-Silva & Galileo, 2015
Dolichestola monnei Galileo & Santos-Silva, 2016
 Dolichestola nigricornis Breuning, 1942
 Dolichestola vittipennis Breuning, 1948

References

Desmiphorini